The Grammy Award for Best Female Rock Vocal Performance was an award presented at the Grammy Awards, a ceremony that was established in 1958 and originally called the Gramophone Awards, to female recording artists for works (songs or albums) containing quality vocal performances in the rock music genre. Honors in several categories are presented at the ceremony annually by the National Academy of Recording Arts and Sciences of the United States to "honor artistic achievement, technical proficiency and overall excellence in the recording industry, without regard to album sales or chart position".

Originally called the Grammy Award for Best Rock Vocal Performance, Female, the award was first presented to Donna Summer in 1980. Beginning with the 1995 ceremony, the name of the award was changed to Best Female Rock Vocal Performance. However, in 1988, 1992, 1994, and since 2005, this category was combined with the Grammy Award for Best Male Rock Vocal Performance and presented in a genderless category known as Best Rock Vocal Performance, Solo. The solo category was later renamed to Best Solo Rock Vocal Performance beginning in 2005. This fusion has been criticized, especially when female performers are not nominated under the solo category. The Academy has cited a lack of eligible recordings in the female rock category as the reason for the mergers. While the award has not been presented since the category merge in 2005, an official confirmation of its retirement has not been announced.

Pat Benatar, Sheryl Crow, and Tina Turner hold the record for the most wins in this category, with four wins each. Melissa Etheridge and Alanis Morissette have been presented the award two times each. Crow's song "There Goes the Neighborhood" was nominated twice; one version from the album The Globe Sessions was nominated in 1999 (but lost to Morissette's song "Uninvited"), and a live version from the album Sheryl Crow and Friends: Live from Central Park was nominated and won in 2001. Since its inception, American artists have been presented with the award more than any other nationality, though it has been presented to vocalists from Canada three times. Stevie Nicks holds the record for the most nominations without a win, with five.

Recipients

 Each year is linked to the article about the Grammy Awards held that year.
 Award was combined with the Best Male Rock Vocal Performance category and presented in a genderless category known as Best Rock Vocal Performance, Solo.

See also

 American rock
 List of female rock singers
 List of music awards honoring women

References

General
  Note: User must select the "Rock" category as the genre under the search feature.
 

Specific

External links
Official site of the Grammy Awards

 
1980 establishments in the United States
2004 disestablishments in the United States
Awards disestablished in 2004
Awards established in 1980
Female Rock Vocal Performance
Music awards honoring women